Overcompleteness is a concept from linear algebra that is widely used in mathematics, computer science, engineering, and statistics (usually in the form of overcomplete  frames). It was introduced by R. J. Duffin and A. C. Schaeffer in 1952.

In this sense, the system contains more vectors than necessary to be complete, hence "overcomplete".

In research areas such as signal processing and function approximation, overcompleteness can help researchers to achieve a more stable, more robust, or more compact decomposition than using a basis.

Relation between overcompleteness and frames

Overcompleteness is usually discussed as a property of overcomplete frames. The theory of frame originates in a paper by Duffin and Schaeffer on non-harmonic Fourier series. The frame is defined to be a set of non-zero vectors  such that for an arbitrary ,

 

When  and  can be chosen such that , the frame is called a tight frame.

It can be seen that .
An example of frame can be given as follows.

 

Let  be the frame operator,

 

A frame that is not a Riesz basis, in which case it consists of a set of functions more than a basis, is said to be overcomplete. In this case, given , it can have different decompositions based on the frame. The frame given in the example above is an overcomplete frame.

When frames are used for function estimation, one may want to compare the performance of different frames. The parsimony of the approximating functions by different frames may be considered as one way to compare their performances.

 

Then let

 

 indicates the parsimony of utilizing frame  to approximate . Different  may have different  based on the hardness to be approximated with elements in the frame.

 

For another frame , if , then frame  is better than frame  at level . And if there exists a  that for each , we have , then  is better than  broadly.

Overcomplete frames are usually constructed in three ways.
 Combine a set of bases, such as wavelet basis and Fourier basis, to obtain an overcomplete frame.
 Enlarge the range of parameters in some frame, such as in Gabor frame and wavelet frame, to have an overcomplete frame.
 Add some other functions to an existing complete basis to achieve an overcomplete frame.

An example of an overcomplete frame is shown below. The collected data is in a two-dimensional space, and in this case a basis with two elements should be able to explain all the data. However, when noise is included in the data, a basis may not be able to express the properties of the data. If an overcomplete frame with four elements corresponding to the four axes in the figure is used to express the data, each point would be able to have a good expression by the overcomplete frame.

The flexibility of the overcomplete frame is one of its key advantages when used in expressing a signal or approximating a function. However, because of this redundancy, a function can have multiple expressions under an overcomplete frame. When the frame is finite, the decomposition can be expressed as

 

Based on this, some other properties may also be considered when solving the equation, such as sparsity. So different researchers have been working on solving this equation by adding other constraints in the objective function. For example, a constraint minimizing 's norm in  may be used in solving this equation. This should be equivalent to the Lasso regression in statistics community. Bayesian approach is also used to eliminate the redundancy in an overcomplete frame. Lweicki and Sejnowski proposed an algorithm for overcomplete frame by viewing it as a probabilistic model of the observed data.

Examples of overcomplete frames
In modern analysis in signal processing and other engineering field, various overcomplete frames are proposed and used. Here two common used frames, Gabor frames and wavelet frames, are introduced and discussed.

Gabor frames
In usual Fourier transformation, the function in time domain is transformed to the frequency domain. However, the
transformation only shows the frequency property of this function and loses its information in the time domain. If a
window function , which only has nonzero value in a small interval, is multiplied with the original
function before operating the Fourier transformation, both the information in time and frequency domains may remain
at the chosen interval.
information of the function in time domain are kept after the transformation.

Let operators

 

 

 

However, not for every  and  
When ,  is possible to be a frame, in which case it is a Riesz basis.
The Gabor family  is also a frame and sharing the same frame bounds as 

Different kinds of window function  may be used in Gabor frame. Here examples of three window functions are shown, and the condition for the corresponding Gabor system being a frame is shown as
follows.

(1) ,  is a frame when

(2) ,  is a frame when

(3) , where  is the indicator function. The situation for
 to be a frame stands as follows.

3) , is a frame

not a frame

The above discussion is a summary of chapter 8 in.

Wavelet frames

A collection of wavelet usually refers to a set of functions based on 

 

However, when  can take values in
, the set represents an overcomplete frame and called undecimated wavelet basis. In general case, a

 

The upper and lower bound of this frame can be computed as follows.
Let  be the Fourier transform for 

 

When  are fixed, define

 

 

Then

 

 

Furthermore, when

 

 , for all odd integers 

the generated frame  is a tight frame.

The discussion in this section is based on chapter 11 in.

Applications
Overcomplete Gabor frames and Wavelet frames have been used in various research area including signal detection, image representation, object recognition, noise reduction, sampling theory, operator theory, harmonic analysis, nonlinear sparse approximation, pseudodifferential operators, wireless communications, geophysics, quantum computing, and filter banks.

References

Linear algebra
Mathematical analysis